Is Growing Faith (also occasionally referred to as White Fence Is Growing Faith) is a 2011 album by Tim Presley under the moniker White Fence. The album was first released on January 18, 2011 through Woodist. Presley served as the album's primary artist and worked as the album's composer, engineer, and lyricist, as well as designing the album's artwork. Some vocals were performed by Emily Sills.

Track listing

Reception
Critical reception for Is Growing Faith has been mixed to positive and the album currently holds a rating of 71 on Metacritic, based upon 7 reviews. Allmusic praised the album as a whole and remarked that it was "a good jumping-off spot for further psychedelic discovery". Pitchfork Media also rated the album favorably and gave it an overall score of 7.4.

References

2011 albums
Tim Presley albums